Delsbo IF is a Swedish football club located in Delsbo.

Background
Delsbo IF currently plays in Division 4 Hälsingland which is the sixth tier of Swedish football. They play their home matches at the Delsbo IP in Delsbo.

The club is affiliated to Hälsinglands Fotbollförbund.

Season to season

Footnotes

External links
 Delsbo IF – Official website
 Delsbo IF on Facebook

Football clubs in Gävleborg County
1912 establishments in Sweden